Pancha Bhuta or Pancha Maha-Bhuta, five great elements, also five physical elements, is a group of five basic elements, which, according to Hinduism, is the basis of all cosmic creation. These elements are: Prithvi/Bhudevi (Sanskrit: पृथ्वी:, Earth), Apas/Varuna/Jala (Sanskrit: आपः, Water), Agni (Sanskrit: अग्नि, Fire), Vayu (Sanskrit: वायु:, Air), Akasha/Dyaus (Sanskrit: आकाश, Space/Atmosphere/Ether). These elements have different characteristics and these also account for different faculties of human experience. In ayurveda and Indian philosophy, the human body is considered to be made of these five elements. However, Cārvāka did not accept Akasha as basic element as it is not tangible and according to them, there are only four basic elements. Hinduism influenced Buddhism, which accepts only four Mahābhūtas, viewing Akasha as a derived (upādā) element. These five elements of Indian cosmological system are similar but not identical to five element theory used in East Asia.

Description

The Pancha Bhuta are the basic elements that make up any living organism on Earth or anywhere else in the Universe. Below table gives a reference on what component of the human body is associated with these elements. Each of the five finger in human beings is also associated with a particular element, so this means the energy associated with the appropriate element can be channelized through various hand mudras.

Ayurveda

According to ayurveda and Yoga, Pancha Bhuta are associated with overall health of human being. Any disorder in human body indicates imbalance of one or more of these elements. Yoga Tattva Mudra Vijnana relates these five elements to five fingers of human being. Different Mudra were developed to balance these in human body which form the Hasta Mudra in yogic tradition and are used in naturopathy.

The three dosha- three intrinsic tendencies, which, according to ayurveda are intrinsic in every human being, are representation of combination of these five elements in human body. The three dosha have subtle positive essences which control the mind and body function.

Yogic view
According to Yoga, the aim of sadhana is to have mastery over oneself. This mastery can be achieved by mastering all the basic elements. The process of gaining mastery over these elements and purifying them is called Bhuta Shuddhi.

Pancha Bhuta Stalam is representation of Pancha Bhuta for yogic practice. People used to move from one temple
to another and do sadhana on particular basic element.

The seven Chakras in the human subtle body are associated with these five elements.

Hasta Mudras

Hasta Mudra or hand posture is based on the panch Bhutas. The basic assumption is that all the five elements can be represented by five different fingers in human body as shown in the table below.

Vastu

Vastu shastra emphasizes on the placement of five elements in specified direction and the balance of these elements determines the condition of the associated structure.

These correlations are used to define an ideal home: The house itself is placed so that maximum load and weight is in the southwest area of the plot. Thus, there is maximum open space in the north and east sides of the plot, satisfying Vayu/air and Akasha/aether.  The main gate, the verandah and the main door are in the northeast of the house; south of the verandah the main living room, and south of that one or two bedrooms.  The kitchen is placed in the southeast corner of the house, to balance Akasha and Agni.

Taste
Pancha Bhuta is associated with six human tastes/Rasas as below.

See also
 Pancha Bhuta Stalam
 Classical element
 Mahābhūta
 Tanmatras
 Mudra

References

Hindu philosophical concepts
Hindu iconography
Classical elements
Ayurveda
Yoga concepts